The Hon. John Charles Dundas (21 August 1808 – 14 February 1866) was a British Whig, and later Liberal politician.

Background
Dundas was a younger son of Lawrence Dundas, 1st Earl of Zetland, and Harriot (née Hale). Thomas Dundas, 2nd Earl of Zetland, was his elder brother.

Political career
Dundas entered Parliament for Richmond, Yorkshire, in 1830, a seat he held until 1835, and again between 1841 and 1847 and 1865 and 1866. He also represented York from 1835 to 1837.

Family
Dundas married Margaret Matilda, daughter of James Talbot and Mary (née Sutton), in 1843. His eldest son Lawrence succeeded in the earldom of Zetland in 1873 and was created Marquess of Zetland in 1892. His second son John was a politician. Dundas died in Nice, in February 1866, aged 57. His wife survived him by over 40 years and died in December 1907.

References

External links 
 

1808 births
1866 deaths
Younger sons of earls
Members of the Parliament of the United Kingdom for English constituencies
UK MPs 1830–1831
UK MPs 1831–1832
UK MPs 1832–1835
UK MPs 1835–1837
UK MPs 1841–1847
UK MPs 1865–1868